Cyril Edward Evans was born 10 January 1896 in Christchurch and died 13 May 1975 in Christchurch. He was a New Zealand cricketer who played 13 first-class matches for the Canterbury Wizards in the Plunket Shield. He also played one match for the All Blacks in 1921.

References

1896 births
1975 deaths
New Zealand cricketers
Canterbury cricketers
New Zealand rugby union players
New Zealand international rugby union players
Rugby union players from Christchurch
Rugby union fullbacks